Redhead Surf Lifesaving Club is one of the oldest surf clubs on the New South Wales coast. It is affiliated with Surf Life Saving Australia, and its club colours are yellow and blue.

History
The Redhead Surf Lifesaving Club was on Saturday, 12 December 1908.  Residents of Redhead and Dudley met at Matchett's Hall and Billiard Room on Ocean Street in Dudley, New South Wales. F. Matchett chaired a meeting to elect the first club officers, which were G.H. Thomas, President, E.J. Doyle, Secretary, W. Pullbrook, treasurer and Tom Conlon, Captain.  The new club members decided to seek affiliation with the NSW Amateur Swimming Association, and a report in the Newcastle Morning Herald and Miner's Advocate stated that "The club members are erecting dressing sheds on the beach and hope to have them finished before the holidays.  They also have a life line and reel there in case of emergency". The "reel" was merely a long line wound onto a drum. The club's first proper surf reel and line was obtained three years later and commissioned on 2 December 1911.  Club records list 31 foundation members for the 1908-09 season.

At a club meeting held on 16 March 1909, correspondence was received and read from the NSW Surf Bather's Association.  The meeting then moved to affiliate with the Surf Bather's Association and to pay the affiliation fee of one guinea.

On 12 April 1915 a special meeting was held to discuss ways and means of providing a clubhouse. However, it was not until 1929 that the first permanent clubhouse was built from donated timber and bricks.

Membership declined after the First World War and went into recess for three seasons between 1919 and 1922.  The beach did however continue to be patrolled, gear maintained, and the occasional meeting held.  Redhead SLSC was resumed for the 1922-1923 season but recessed again from 1924 to 1926.   After reopening for the 1927 season, ten members were the club's first to pass examinations for the Surf Bronze Medallion.

Membership
Membership is open to anyone from the age of 5.

Lifesaving competitions
Redhead's members compete in pool and ocean lifesaving events at local, state, national, and international competitions.

See also

Surf lifesaving
Surf Life Saving Australia
List of Australian surf lifesaving clubs

References

External links
 
 Redhead Surf Lifesaving Club website

Sport in New South Wales
Surf Life Saving Australia clubs
1908 establishments in Australia
Sports clubs established in 1908